A peace pole is a monument that displays the message "May Peace Prevail on Earth" in the language of the country where it has been placed, and usually 3 to 13 additional translations. The message often is referred to as a peace prayer.

The idea of peace poles was first thought up by Masahisa Goi in 1955 in Japan. The peace pole project today is promoted by The World Peace Prayer Society as well as other groups and individuals. The first peace poles outside Japan were constructed in 1983. Since then, more than 200,000 have been placed around the world in close to 200 countries.

Peace poles are made of many materials; most are made of wood, while others are made of limestone, copper, plastic or stainless steel. The text might be painted, carved, etched, welded, pasted, or riveted on, or it might simply be a plastic plaque attached with screws. In other cases, it is the careful work of an artist or sculptor.

Sometimes the word prayer is avoided so that peace poles are not regarded as religious objects therefore violating zoning restrictions. For example, a Quaker group in New York City ran into this problem year after year, and did not get permission to plant a peace pole in a park. Some manufacturers refer to the wording as a Peace Message for this reason.

Peace poles have been placed in such notable locations as the north magnetic pole, the Hiroshima Peace Memorial, the site of the Egyptian pyramids in Giza, and the Aiki Shrine in Iwama, Japan. Peace poles are commonly installed at high-profile public gathering places, such as community parks or near the entrances of churches or schools. In one case, a garden, created for a wedding, was designed around the peace pole that was its centerpiece. The Republic of Molossia, a micronation, has a peace pole in eight languages. The University of California, Los Angeles has a limestone peace pole with 14 languages directly in front of Kerckhoff Hall.

The initial inspiration for planting a peace pole often is as a response to a local historic hate crime, incident or issue. Another of the largest peace poles in the world, as measured in tons, is the granite peace pole in Beech Acres Park near Cincinnati, Ohio, inspired by hate literature left in the driveways of Jewish residents.

In September 2016, the World Peace Prayer Society and the Little Free Library project announced a collaboration to offer a new peace pole library structure. It features the standard peace pole message of peace – "May Peace Prevail on Earth" – in a six-foot library. Some of these new libraries were installed at locations significant to the civil rights movement, such as the 16th Street Baptist Church in Birmingham, Alabama.

The message in each language
The multilingual inscription of a peace pole constitutes a parallel text with top-to-bottom sentences. Each one is usually shown:
 rotated clockwise in languages using LTR scripts (English, Latin, ...)
 rotated counterclockwise in languages using RTL scripts (Arabic, Hebrew, ...)
 arranged vertically in languages using East Asian scripts (Japanese, Chinese, ...)

They can be set in different case styles (sentence case, title case all caps, small caps), even on a single pole.

Gallery

See also
 Ceremonial pole

Further reading 
Translation sources: https://web.archive.org/web/20170511155434/http://www.peace-pole.com/translations_for_peace_poles.htm or http://www-peace.sakura.ne.jp/pages/_Earth.htm
Map with all the peace poles

References

External links

 The World Peace Prayer Society page on peace poles
 The Global Heart page on peace poles
 The Peace Pole Makers USA
 Peace poles made by a sculptor
 Peace pole locations worldwide – various platforms/sites
 Waymarking.com: Monuments > Peace poles category (late 2018: ~800 entries)
 U.S. Pacific Northwest Rotary Club 100 peace pole project
 Maptive peace pole map; mainly Pacific Northwest, but a few other U.S. and Mexico

Types of monuments and memorials
Pole
Peace monuments and memorials
1955 introductions
Articles containing video clips